Katia is a feminine given name. It is a variant of Katya.

Notable people with this name

Actresses and models 
Katia Dandoulaki, Greek actress
Katia Margaritoglou, Greek fashion model and beauty contestant
Katia Winter (born 1983), Swedish actress

Athletes 
Katia Belabas (born 1996), Algerian sailor
Katia Benth (born 1985), French sprinting athlete
Katia Gutiérrez (born 1989), Mexican boxer
Kátia Lopes (born 1973), Brazilian volleyball player
Katia Piccolini (born 1973), Italian female tennis player
Kátia Cilene Teixeira (born 1977), Brazilian female footballer
Katia Zini (born 1981), Italian short track speed skater

Musicians and singers 
Katia Escalera, Bolivian soprano
Katia Labèque (born 1950), French piano player
Katia Ricciarelli (born 1946), Italian soprano
Katia Skanavi (born 1971), Russian pianist of Greek descent
Katia Zuccarelli, Canadian singer of Italian descent

Writers 
Katia Kapovich (born 1960), Russian poet now living in the United States
Katia Noyes, American author

Other people 
Kátia Abreu (born 1962), Brazilian politician
Katia Bellillo (born 1951), Italian politician
Katia Krafft (1942–1991), French volcanologist who died in a pyroclastic flow on Mount Unzen
Katia Mann (1883–1980), wife of the German writer Thomas Mann
Katia Sycara, Greek-American research professor in the Robotics Institute at Carnegie Mellon University

Fictional characters 
Katia Anderson, one of the supporting characters in Professor Layton and the Diabolical Box
Katia, in Low Winter Sun (U.S. TV series)
Katia Jaakkola, the kidnapping victim in the "Doll House" arc of Bordertown (Finnish TV series)

References

Feminine given names